Erskine Barton Childers (11 March 1929 – 25 August 1996) was an Irish writer, BBC correspondent and United Nations senior civil servant. He was the eldest son of Erskine Hamilton Childers (Ireland's fourth President) and Ruth Ellen Dow Childers. His grandparents Mary Alden Childers and Robert Erskine Childers and the latter's double first cousin Robert Barton were all Irish nationalists involved heavily with the negotiation of Irish independence; which ultimately led to his grandfather's execution during the Irish Civil War. His great aunt was Gretchen Osgood Warren.

Early life

Childers was born in Dublin to Erskine Hamilton Childers and his first wife Ruth Ellen Dow. He grew up in a multi cultural atmosphere which was to influence his whole life. From an early age, he had an obvious fascination with history and world affairs. He studied at Newtown School, Waterford and much later on at Trinity College, Dublin, and Stanford University. At Stanford University he was actively involved with the National Student Association and rose to Vice-President of the organisation by 1949.

The BBC and the Arab World

By 1960, Childers was in London working for the BBC in both Radio and Television. His broadcasts from the BBC World Service ranged on varying topics from the Suez Crisis and Palestine to the John F. Kennedy assassination in 1963. He was one of the first presenters at the start of the BBC TV show The Money Programme in 1966. The Suez Canal and Palestine issues would later form the basis of his writing on the subjects.

He was distinguished as one of the first mainstream writers in the West to systematically challenge the contention that Palestinian Arab refugees of the 1947–48 Civil War in Mandatory Palestine and the 1948 Arab–Israeli War (see 1948 Palestinian exodus) fled their homes primarily from Arab broadcast evacuation orders (see Broadcasts for Christopher Hitchens' article about same), rather than from the use of force and terror by armed forces of the newly forming state of Israel.

United Nations Civil Servant

He specialised in UN issues, even serving as a periodic consultant including a special mission in the Congo for Secretary-General U Thant. In 1967, under the leadership of Henry Richardson Labouisse, Jr.; Childers was hired to lead a United Nations, UNICEF & UNDP programme called Development Support Communication; or DSCS. In 1968, Childers co-authored a paper with United Nations colleague Mallica Vajrathon called "Project Support Communication," later published in an important anthology about social change. In this paper he wrote,  From 1975 to 1988, Childers was based in New York as Director of Information for UNDP. By his retirement in 1989 as Senior Advisor to the UN Director General for Development and International Economic Co-operation, after 22 years of service; Childers had worked with most of the organisations of the UN system, at all levels and in all regions.

The Ford Foundation and the Dag Hammarskjöld Foundation

After his retirement, Erskine Childers continued to strive relentlessly for the ideals for which he had worked so hard. He co-authored several notable books for the Ford Foundation and the Dag Hammarskjöld Foundation on the reform of the United Nations with his colleague and equally devoted United Nations civil servant, Sir Brian Urquhart. The best known of these publications is A World in Need of Leadership. He continued writing on United Nations matters whilst travelling constantly; lecturing on the Organisation and the many challenges confronting it, such as globalisation and democracy, conflict prevention and peace-keeping, humanitarian assistance, human rights, famine, ageing and development, health, financial arrangement of the United Nations, citizen's rights, female participation, design and perceptions, education, the North South divide and world economy. In 1995, Childers co-authored a paper with his international law colleague Marjolijn Snippe called "The Agenda for Peace and the Law of the Sea", for Pacem in Maribus XXIII, the Annual Conference of the International Ocean Institute, that was held in Costa Rica, December 1995.

He became Secretary General of the World Federation of United Nations Associations in March 1996. He served for only five months, and died on 25 August 1996 during the organisation's fiftieth anniversary congress. He is buried in Roundwood, Ireland.

Notes

Further reading

Erskine B Childers  "Renewing The United Nations System " (Dag Hammarskjöld Foundation (1994)
Erskine B Childers  "In A Time Beyond Warnings : Strengthening The United Nations System" (Catholic Institute For International Resources) (1993) 
Erskine B Childers and Sir Brian Urquhart A World in Need of Leadership: Tomorrow's United Nations The Ford Foundation, (New York) 1996
Erskine B Childers  and Sir Brian Urquhart  Renewing the United Nations System The Ford Foundation, (New York) 1994
Erskine B Childers  and Sir Brian Urquhart Toward a More Effective United Nations, Reorganization of the United Nations Secretariat: A Suggested Outline of Needed Reforms, Strengthening International Response to Humanitarian Emergencies The Ford Foundation, (New York) 1992
Erskine B Childers  "Where Democracy Doesn't Work Yet" Harpers Magazine, April 1960 |http://www.harpers.org/archive/1960/04/0009271
Erskine B Childers  "Il Mondo Arabo : Volume 20" (Cose D'Oggi) (Milano) Valentino Bompiani (1961)
Erskine B Childers  "Challenges To The United Nations : Building A Safer World" (St. Martin's Press) New York (1994) 
Erskine B Childers  "The Road To Suez" (MacGibbon & Kee) (London) (1962)
Erskine B Childers  "Common Sense About the Arab World" (Macmillan Publishers) (1960)
The Other Exodus, his much quoted article in The Spectator, 12 May 1961
 Ford Foundation Page on his contribution to UN Reform.

1929 births
1996 deaths
Erskine Barton
Children of presidents of Ireland
Irish writers
Irish people of American descent
Suez Crisis
Stanford University alumni
People educated at Newtown School, Waterford
Alumni of Trinity College Dublin